The 2018–19 Indiana State Sycamores basketball team represented Indiana State University during the 2018–19 NCAA Division I men's basketball season. The Sycamores, led by ninth-year head coach Greg Lansing, played their home games at the Hulman Center in Terre Haute, Indiana as members of the Missouri Valley Conference. They finished the season 15–16, 7–11 in MVC play to finish in a tie for eighth place. As the No. 8 seed in the MVC tournament, they lost to Valparaiso in the first round.

ISU coach Greg Lansing began the season needing two wins during the season to surpass his mentor (Royce Waltman) on the ISU Coaching Leaderboard. Waltman had 134 wins. Lansing passed Waltman following the Sycamores victory over the McKendree Bearcats and is currently second (148) in wins at Indiana State; the leader Duane Klueh has 182. Junior Guard Jordan Barnes became the 39th member of the ISU 1,000-pt Club.

Previous season 
The Sycamores finished the 2017–18 season 13–18, 8–10 in MVC play to finish in sixth place. They lost in the quarterfinals of the MVC tournament to Illinois State.

Offseason

Departures

Incoming transfers

2018 recruiting class

2019 recruiting class

Roster

Schedule and results

|-
!colspan=9 style=|Exhibition

|-
!colspan=9 style=|Non-conference regular season

|-
!colspan=9 style=| Missouri Valley regular season

|-
!colspan=9 style=| Missouri Valley tournament

Source

References

Indiana State Sycamores men's basketball seasons
Indiana State
Indiana State
Indiana State